SERC, Serc, etc. may refer to:

Places
 Sérc, a municipality in Austria

Chemistry
 Phosphoserine transaminase, an enzyme

Medicine
 Serc, a brand name of the antivertigo drug betahistine

Organizations
 State Electricity Regulatory Commissions, in India
 South Eastern Regional College, in Northern Ireland
 State Emergency Response Commission, in the US; See Emergency Planning and Community Right-to-Know Act
 Stock Exchange Rifle Club, in England

Science and technology organizations
 Science Education Resource Center, an office of Carleton College in Minnesota, US, that provides resources for geoscience faculty
 Science and Engineering Research Council, a UK agency that oversaw publicly funded scientific research until 1994
 SERC Reliability Corporation, one of nine regional electric reliability councils of the North American Electric Reliability Corporation (NERC)
 Smithsonian Environmental Research Center, an environmental research center in Maryland, US
 Solar Energy Research Center, one of various independent solar energy research centers 
 Space Environment Research Center, at Kyushu University located in Fukuoka, Japan
 Supercomputer Education Research Centre, a central computing facility at the Indian Institute of Science in Bangalore, India

See also
 Circ (disambiguation)